Richard A. Bandstra is a former member of the Michigan House of Representatives and a judge on the Michigan Court of Appeals.

Career
Formerly an attorney in private practice with the prestigious Warner, Norcross and Judd law firm, Bandstra was elected as a MI State Representative for the Grand Rapids area in 1985.  He served through 1994 and was the Republican Co-Floor Leader after the 1992 election resulted in an equally split House, with 55 members from each party.

Bandstra was elected to the Court of Appeals in 1994, serving through his retirement in January 2010. He was Chief Judge of the Court from 1998 through 2001. While on the bench, Bandstra travelled extensively in Slovakia, working on a project to develop legislation pertaining to independence for judges in the newly freed country.

Charitable work
Bandstra served from 2013 through 2017 as the volunteer Executive Director of the Association for a More Just Society (AJS), a Christian organization working with a sister organization in Honduras, seeking to assure better government services and just policies for the poor and powerless in that country.

References

1950 births
Living people
Politicians from Chicago
Politicians from Grand Rapids, Michigan
Calvin University alumni
University of Chicago Law School alumni
Republican Party members of the Michigan House of Representatives
Michigan Court of Appeals judges
20th-century American politicians
20th-century American judges
21st-century American judges